P. amplexicaulis may refer to:
 Persicaria amplexicaulis, a plant species
 Plantago amplexicaulis, a plant species